Ahmed Kadhi (born ) is a Tunisian male volleyball player. As part of the Tunisia men's national volleyball team, he competed at the 2012 Summer Olympics in London, Great Britain. His club in 2012 was C.O. Kelibia. His current club is E.S.Sahel.

He competed at the 2020 Summer Olympics.

Clubs
  C.O. Kelibia
  E.S. Sahel

See also
 Tunisia at the 2012 Summer Olympics

References

External links

1989 births
Living people
Tunisian men's volleyball players
Volleyball players at the 2012 Summer Olympics
Olympic volleyball players of Tunisia
People from Nabeul Governorate
Mediterranean Games silver medalists for Tunisia
Mediterranean Games medalists in volleyball
Competitors at the 2013 Mediterranean Games
Volleyball players at the 2020 Summer Olympics